P. digitalis may refer to:
 Penstemon digitalis, a plantain species
 Physostegia digitalis, a perennial plant species in the genus Physostegia

See also
 Digitalis